ALF ("Another logical framework") is a structure editor for monomorphic Martin-Löf type theory developed at Chalmers University. It is a predecessor of the Alfa, Agda, Cayenne and Coq proof assistants and dependently typed programming languages. It was the first language to support inductive families and dependent pattern matching.

References

Further reading 
 Lena Magnusson and Bengt Nordström. "The ALF proof editor and its proof engine".
 Thorsten Altenkirch, Veronica Gaspes, Bengt Nordström and Björn von Sydow. "A user's guide to ALF".

External links 
 Alfa

Academic programming languages
Dependently typed languages
Proof assistants